Huron is a city in Erie County, Ohio, United States, located at the mouth of the Huron River on Lake Erie. The population was 6,922 at the 2020 census. It is part of the Sandusky micropolitan area.

History
Huron Township was at the center of the "Firelands" region of the Connecticut Western Reserve.  The first permanent settler in the area that became Huron Township was a Quebec-born trapper, trader and interpreter named John Baptiste Flammand (or, "Flemming"; and often misspelled "Flemmond"), who established a trading post about 1805, approx. two miles inland upon the east bank of the Huron River. Other French traders had preceded him, including Gabriel Hunot in the 1780s.

Huron Township was established in 1809. Huron Village was later established between 1821 and 1824, when a town plat was surveyed, and port facilities at the mouth of the Huron River were developed; and the village quickly became a major shipbuilding center in the 1830s. [The current community of Huron is sometimes mistaken to have been the same as the "town plat of Huron" (also known as "the old County Seat" village), which was established about 1814, and was actually within the present Milan Township (formerly known as Avery Township before 1821).]

The Wheeling and Lake Erie Railroad greatly expanded Huron's port on the east bank of the Huron River beginning in 1880.  The first cargo of iron ore at the W&LE docks was received May 21, 1884.  The port is still in use today, accepting cargoes of iron ore and limestone from lake freighters.  Huron was also the home port of several commercial fishing fleets before unbridled lake pollution decimated the industry on Lake Erie by the early 1970s.  Water quality in Lake Erie has greatly improved as a result of strong environmental controls since then and sport fishing has increased in popularity in the area.  However, the Lake faces new threats from algal blooms and several invasive species such as zebra mussels and Asian carp that may impact sport fishing in the future.

Geography

Huron is located at  (41.399669, -82.564974).

Demographics

The median income for a household in the city was $59,766, and the median income for a family was $73,068. Male full-time, year-round workers had a median income of $51,003 versus $41,667 for female full-time, year-round workers. The per capita income for the city was $29,213. About 2.5% of families and 5% of the population were below the poverty line, including 2.6% of those under age 18 and 5.6% of those age 65 or over.

2010 Census
As of the 2010 census, there were 7,149 people, 3,073 households, and 1,988 families residing in the city. The racial makeup of the city was 96.4% White, 0.9% African American, 0.3% Native American, 0.5% Asian, 0.3% from other races, and 1.5% from two or more races. Hispanic or Latino of any race were 2.3% of the population.

There were 3,073 households, of which 29.1% had children under the age of 18 living with them, 49.6% were married couples living together, 10.8% had a female householder with no husband present, 4.2% had a male householder with no wife present, and 35.3% were non-families. 29.5% of all households were made up of individuals, and 11.9% had someone living alone who was 65 years of age or older. The average household size was 2.30 and the average family size was 2.84.

The median age in the city was 43.9 years. 22.7% of residents were under the age of 18; 6.7% were between the ages of 18 and 24; 22% were from 25 to 44; 30.2% were from 45 to 64; and 18.4% were 65 years of age or older. The gender makeup of the city was 48.1% male and 51.9% female.

Economy
Commercial and industrial development of Huron had historically been centered around the riverfront port area. By the early 1960s a busy downtown business district had developed, serving local residents and summer tourists. However, with improvements to U.S. Route 6 and Ohio Route 2 bypassing the downtown area and enabling quicker travel to larger neighboring cities, downtown Huron went into decline. Starting in 1967, the City of Huron embarked on a controversial urban renewal program with funding from various programs of the U.S. federal government, such as the United States Department of Housing and Urban Development, and the State of Ohio. The city purchased, in some cases by eminent domain, and demolished 38 commercial buildings and private homes. It then built a municipal marina, called the Huron Boat Basin, as the focal point of a new downtown. While the "Boat Basin" has become a popular community park and gathering place, extensive redevelopment of the downtown area did not occur as quickly as envisioned. New industry and commercial development has more recently occurred on the southern and western city limits and suburbs.

ConAgra site renewal
On July 18, 2006, the Ohio Department of Natural Resources (ODNR) announced the purchase of the ConAgra Foods facility in Huron. Concurrently, ConAgra Foods announced the closure of the grain elevator. The 19.8-acre (80,000 m2) parcel is a key piece of Huron's waterfront. The Ohio Department of Natural Resources (ODNR), Division of Watercraft has completed a public boating and fishing access site with launch ramps, docks and parking facilities. The City of Huron assumed title to the former grain silos and flour mill and received a grant to demolish the building, which was completed in August 2012.  It envisions a future riverfront development to include restaurants, retail stores, condominiums and greenspace.

On January 8, 2012, much of the former Con-Agra mill structure was demolished by implosion in a public event attracting media attention and a large crowd.  The former grain silos were removed by manual demolition.

Education

Primary and secondary
The Huron City School District has four schools for each level of public education:
 Shawnee Elementary School
 Woodlands Intermediate School
 McCormick Junior High School
 Huron High School

Huron City Schools sports teams are known as the "Tigers". The Huron Tigers have recorded numerous athletic successes for both boys' and girls' scholastic sports competitions.

Postsecondary
BGSU Firelands, a branch campus of Bowling Green State University, is located just west of the city limits. A separate college of the Bowling Green State University system, BGSU Firelands has been a regional campus of Bowling Green since 1968. Over 2,000 students in 2006 were enrolled for a wide variety of associate, bachelors and graduate degree programs. Huron was also the home of the "Huron Playhouse", formerly a division of Bowling Green State University's Department of Theater and Film before becoming an independent, non-profit corporation.

References

External links

 City website

 
Cities in Erie County, Ohio
Ohio populated places on Lake Erie
Populated places established in 1792
Canadian-American culture in Ohio
French-American culture in Ohio
Cities in Ohio